The River Roding rises at Molehill Green, Essex, England, then flows south through Essex and London and forms Barking Creek as it reaches the River Thames.

Course
The river leaves Molehill Green and passes through or near a group of eight or nine villages in Essex known collectively as the Rodings, as their names are 'Roding' prefixed with various different specific names (High, Margaret, Aythorpe etc.). After Chipping Ongar, the river flows under the M25 motorway by Passingford Bridge and Abridge.

 The river then runs between Loughton and Chigwell, where the Roding Valley Meadows make up the largest surviving area of traditionally managed river-valley habitat in Essex. This nature reserve consists of unimproved wet and dry hay meadows, rich with flora and fauna and bounded by thick hedgerows, scrubland, secondary woodland and tree plantation. The meadows stretch down to the M11 motorway and the Roding Valley tube station is situated close to the area, although Loughton or Buckhurst Hill are better placed for a visit. The river then enters Woodford.

Redbridge takes its name from a crossing of the river which then passes through Ilford and Barking near the A406 North Circular Road. The River Roding through Ilford project is a government backed scheme to improve amenities along this stretch of the river. After Barking the tidal section is known as Barking Creek, which flows into the Thames at Creekmouth, where the Barking Barrier acts as a flood defence.

As a boundary
In Essex the river forms part of the boundary between the district of Epping Forest and borough of Brentwood. The river marks the southernmost part of the boundary between the London Borough of Newham and the London Borough of Barking and Dagenham.

Former name
Ilford takes its name from Ilefort, "ford on the River Hyle", which was the ancient name for the lower part of the Roding.

See also
 Tributaries of the River Thames
 List of rivers of England
 Wanstead Sewage Works

References

External links

 River Roding at Passingford Bridge
 The River Roding Trust

Rivers of London
Rivers of Essex
Geography of the London Borough of Newham
Geography of the London Borough of Redbridge
Geography of the London Borough of Barking and Dagenham
Epping Forest District
1Roding